The Clásico Joven (Spanish for: The Young Classic) is an association football rivalry between Mexico City-based teams Club América and Cruz Azul.

The first match between both teams was on 30 August 1964 in the stadium 10 de Diciembre, with Club América winning the match 2–1 with goals by Marín Ibarreche and Alfonso Portugal,  while Hilario Díaz scored for the Cruz Azul. However, the clásico truly began on 9 August 1972 when both teams played against each other in the final during the 1971–72 season, where the "cementeros" defeated América 4–1.

History 

After Cruz Azul would win the title in the Segunda División de México during the season 1963–64 and was able to gain promotion into top flight football, they would face Club América during week 13 on 30 August 1964 in the stadium 10 de Diciembre where the score ended 2–1 with a victory for the "azulcrema". In just a couple of years had important wins and in 1971 they decided to move to Mexico City and play at Estadio Azteca, actual stadium of Club América. Years later these club had great matches in which Cruz Azul became the team of the 1970s, where they earned the nickname"La Maquina", and Club América the best of the 1980s.

This rivalry became a true derby during the season 1971–72 where the teams played each other in the final and the "cementeros" came out with a convincing victory of 4–1, this result hit hard for the Americanistas since Cruz Azul also knocked them out of Copa México the same season.

Club América were able to redeem some dignity in Copa México 1973 where they were able to defeat Cruz Azul in an aggregate score of 3–2 with two goals by Osvaldo "Pata Bendita" Castro and one by Roberto Hodge. But the most significant rematch for Club América was the final during the season 1988–89, where "las Águilas" rose to victory with a first leg score of 3–2 and second leg score of 2–2 which the aggregate score came to be 5–4 with a decisive goal by Carlos Hermosillo who years later would be considered an idol for the "Celestes" winning three Goalscoring titles during the years 1993–1996.

Statistics of the Clásico 

This table takes into account all disputed classic tournaments that have been endorsed by the Federación Mexicana de Fútbol, CONCACAF, the Confederación Sudamericana de Fútbol, or any other tournaments and friendlies.

Players who played on both sides 
So far few players have played with both Club América and Cruz Azul.  Only few have emerged as champions with both sides.

Players with a (*) have championed with both sides.

 Amado Palacios Rendón

 Javier Sánchez Galindo

 Sergio Ceballos

 Francisco Macedo

 Carlos Silvio Fogel Rodríguez

 Alberto Macias

 Nicolás Ramírez

 Cesareo Victorino Ramírez *

 Horacio López Salgado *

 Miguel Angel Cornero *

 Ruben Omar Romano

 Hector Tapia *

 Adrian Camacho *

 Agustin Manzo

 Luis Hernandez

 Carlos Hermosillo *

 Pedro Pineda

 Arturo Álvarez Perea

 Adrian Chavez

 Miguel Zepeda

 Edoardo Isella

 Sebastian Abreu

 Richard Núñez

 Christian Giménez

 Alfonso Blanco

 Francisco Javier Rodríguez

 Vicente Matías Vuoso

 Adrián Aldrete *

 José Madueña

 Pablo Aguilar *

All-time results (only League Without "Liguilla")

Cruz Azul at home

Club América  at home

Liguilla matches

 Last Updated 26 November 2017.

{|width=100%
|width=65%|

References

External links 
 Sitio web oficial América 
 Sitio web oficial Cruz Azul

Football rivalries in Mexico
Club América
Cruz Azul